The  Sea Gull  is a Chesapeake Bay skipjack, built in 1901 at Pocomoke City, Maryland. She is a  two-sail bateau, or "V"-bottomed deadrise type of centerboard sloop. She is one of the 35 surviving traditional Chesapeake Bay skipjacks and a member of the last commercial sailing fleet in the United States. She is located at Wenona, Somerset County, Maryland.

She was listed on the National Register of Historic Places in 1985.

References

External links
, including photo in 1983, at Maryland Historical Trust

Somerset County, Maryland
Skipjacks
Ships on the National Register of Historic Places in Maryland
1901 ships
National Register of Historic Places in Somerset County, Maryland